Leonard Harris "Barrow Boy" Toyne (12 July 1922 – 17 March 1998) was an Australian rules footballer who played for Geelong, Fitzroy and Melbourne in the Victorian Football League (VFL) during the 1940s.

Toyne, from Terang, made his way into the Geelong seniors for the first time in 1940 after serving his apprenticeship in the reserves. He spent the 1942 season at Fitzroy, as Geelong were forced into recess as a result of the war, but was out of action for the next two years due to his service with the Australian Imperial Force (AIF). Returning to Geelong in 1945, Toyne finished third in the club's 'best and fairest'.

After getting married, Toyne moved to Sandringham in 1946 to live and work. Geelong granted him a clearance which allowed him to be appointed captain-coach of the Sandringham Football Club. The club had finished 11th the previous VFA season and had never reached the finals but Toyne steered them to a seven-point Grand Final win over Camberwell. Sandringham were runners-up in 1947 but struggled the following season, with Toyne getting suspended for three matches during the year after an altercation. Five rounds into the 1949 season, Toyne resigned, citing that he was being victimised by the umpires.

He finished the year at Melbourne before crossing to Sturt, which he captain-coached in 1950 and 1951. His final port of call was Launceston for the 1953 Northern Tasmanian Football Association season.

References

Holmesby, Russell and Main, Jim (2007). The Encyclopedia of AFL Footballers. 7th ed. Melbourne: Bas Publishing.

External links

1922 births
1998 deaths
Geelong Football Club players
Fitzroy Football Club players
Melbourne Football Club players
Sandringham Football Club players
Sandringham Football Club coaches
Sturt Football Club players
Sturt Football Club coaches
Launceston Football Club players
Terang Football Club players
Australian rules footballers from Victoria (Australia)
Launceston Football Club coaches
Australian Army personnel of World War II
Military personnel from Victoria (Australia)